Helcionelloida is an extinct group of ancient molluscs (phylum Mollusca).  These are the oldest known conchiferan molluscs, that is, they had a mineralised shell.  Some members of this class were mistaken for Monoplacophorans.  The class was erected by Peel in 1991.

Anatomy

These animals were untorted and they had a coiled, cone-shaped shell.  The majority of species were small (shells being about two millimeters in length and or diameter).  Modern reconstructions depict them as resembling snails.  The shells of some genera, particularly Yochelcionella, also possessed a "snorkel"-like opening which was most likely used for breathing.

2005 taxonomy 
The taxonomy of the Gastropoda by Bouchet & Rocroi, 2005 categorizes members of this taxon within the 
Paleozoic molluscs of uncertain systematic position, but that taxonomy to not use the name Helcionelloida.

2006-2007 taxonomy 
Taxonomy of helcionelloid according to the opinion of P. Yu. Parkhaev:

Gastropoda Cuvier, 1797

Subclass Archaeobranchia Parkhaev, 2001
Order Helcionelliformes Golikov & Starobogatov, 1975
Superfamily Helcionelloidea Wenz, 1938
Family Helcionellidae Wenz, 1938
Family Igarkiellidae Parkhaev, 2001
Family Coreospiridae Knight, 1947

Superfamily Yochelcionelloidea Runnegar & Jell, 1976
Family Trenellidae Parkhaev, 2001
Family Yochelcionellidae Runnegar & Jell, 1976
Family Stenothecidae Runnegar & Jell, 1980
Subfamily Stenothecinae Runnegar & Jell, 1980
Subfamily Watsonellinae Parkhaev, 2001

Order Pelagiellifomes MacKinnon, 1985
Family Pelagiellidae Knight, 1952
Family Aldanellidae Linsley et Kier, 1984

Subclass Divasibranchia Minichev & Starobogatov, 1975
Order Khairkhaniiformes Parkhaev, 2001
Family Khairkhaniidae Missarzhevsky, 1989

Subclass Dextrobranchia Minichev & Starobogatov, 1975
Order Onychochiliformes Minichev & Starobogatov, 1975
Family Onychochilidae Koken, 1925

References

External links 
 Atkins C. J. & Peel J. S. (2008). "Yochelcionella (Mollusca, Helcionelloida) from the lower Cambrian of North America". Bulletin of Geosciences 83(1): 23-38 (8 figures). . - slightly different taxonomic placement of  Yochelcionellidae.
https://web.archive.org/web/20080930105735/http://www.palaeos.com/Invertebrates/Molluscs/BasalMollusca/Conchifera/Helcionelloida.html

 
Mollusc classes
Prehistoric protostome classes